The 1998 Troy State Trojans football team represented Troy State University—now known as Troy University—as a member of the Southland Football League during the 1998 NCAA Division I-AA football season. Led by eighth-year head coach Larry Blakeney, the Trojans compiled an overall record of 8–4 with a mark of 5–2 in conference play, tying of second place the Southland title. The Trojans finished the season ranked No. 13 in the Sports Network poll. The team played home games at Veterans Memorial Stadium in Troy, Alabama.

Schedule

References

Troy State
Troy Trojans football seasons
Troy State Trojans football